The qualifying round of the 2023 World Baseball Classic was held from 16 September 2022 to 5 October 2022. Teams which participated at the 2017 World Baseball Classic automatically qualified for the 2023 tournament. The qualifying round consisted of two tournaments to be participated by six teams each. The qualifiers were planned to be hosted in Tucson, Arizona in the United States but after the delay, the qualifier hosts were changed to the cities of Regensburg, Germany at Armin-Wolf-Arena and Panamá City, Panama at Estadio Rod Carew. Winners and runners-up of each of the two tournaments qualified for the 2023 World Baseball Classic.

The first qualifying tournament was originally scheduled to be held from March 13–18, 2020 and the second from March 20–25, 2020, before the qualifiers' postponement was announced on March 12, 2020, by Major League Baseball due to the COVID-19 pandemic. In resolving the 2021–22 Major League Baseball lockout, Major League Baseball and the Major League Baseball Players Association agreed that the World Baseball Classic would return in 2023 and that qualifiers would begin in September 2022.

Qualified teams

Note: Numbers in parentheses indicate positions in the WBSC World Rankings .

Players

Venues

Pools composition
Note: Numbers in parentheses indicate positions in the WBSC World Rankings .

The format was double-elimination. Each pool contained six teams, two of which are given a bye to the second round. The highest ranked teams in the WBSC World Rankings (the Czech Republic and Germany in Pool A, and Panama and Nicaragua in Pool B) received the byes.

Four of the teams had previously participated in the main WBC tournament: Panama and South Africa in 2006 and 2009 (which were by invitation), and Brazil and Spain in 2013. All four had participated in all qualifying tournaments.

Argentina played in WBC qualifiers for the first time, replacing the Philippines, which appeared in previous qualifying tournaments held in 2012 and 2016. The other 11 teams had all previously participated in WBC qualifying. Two have previously won their qualifying group and qualified for the main tournament (Brazil, Spain), six have previously finished as high as second in their qualifying group (Germany, Great Britain, New Zealand, Nicaragua, Panama, South Africa), Two have previously finished as high as third in their qualifying group (Czech Republic, France), and one has previously finished last in its qualifying group (Pakistan).

Qualifying round

Pool A

|}

*Home team designation determined by coin toss.

Pool B

|}

*Home team designation determined by coin toss.

References

External links
Official website

 
World Baseball Classic - Qualification
World Baseball Classic qualification